Abdullah Dawsh (born 12 December 1987) is a Saudi football plays as a  defender.

References

1987 births
Living people
Saudi Arabian footballers
Al-Faisaly FC players
Al-Qadsiah FC players
Damac FC players
Al-Shoulla FC players
Najd FC players
Al-Dera'a FC players
Saudi First Division League players
Saudi Professional League players
Saudi Fourth Division players
Saudi Second Division players
Association football defenders